Juliette is a novel written by the Marquis de Sade and published 1797–1801, accompanying Sade's 1797 version of his novel Justine. While Justine, Juliette's sister, was a virtuous woman who consequently encountered nothing but despair and abuse, Juliette is an amoral nymphomaniac murderer who is successful and happy. The full title of the novel in the original French is L'Histoire de Juliette ou les Prospérités du vice, and the English title is "Juliette, or Vice Amply Rewarded" (versus "Justine, or Good Conduct Well-Chastised"). As many other of his works, Juliette follows a pattern of violently pornographic scenes followed by long treatises on a broad range of philosophical topics, including theology, morality, aesthetics, naturalism and also Sade's dark, fatalistic view of world metaphysics.

Plot summary
Juliette is raised in a convent. However, at age thirteen she is seduced by a woman who immediately explains that morality, religion and other such concepts are meaningless. There are plenty of similar philosophical musings during the book, all attacking the ideas of God, morals, remorse, love, etc., the overall conclusion being that the only aim in life is "to enjoy oneself at no matter whose expense." Juliette takes this to the extreme and manages to murder her way through numerous people, including various family members and friends.

During Juliette's life from age 13 to about 30, the wanton anti-heroine engages in virtually every form of depravity and encounters a series of like-minded libertines. She befriends the ferocious Clairwil, whose main passion is the murder of boys and young men, as revenge for the general 
brutality of men toward women. She meets Saint Fond, a 50-year-old multi-millionaire who murders his father, commits incest with his daughter, tortures young girls to death on a daily basis, and even plots an ambitious scheme to provoke a famine that will wipe out half the population of France. She also becomes acquainted with Minski, a gigantic ogre-like Muscovite who delights in raping and torturing young boys and girls to death before eating them.

Real people in Juliette
A long audience with Pope Pius VI is one of the more extensive scenes in Juliette. The heroine repeatedly addresses the Pope by his legal name "Braschi." She also flaunts her learning with a verbal, yet highly detailed, catalogue of alleged immoralities committed by his papal predecessors. Their conversation ends (like nearly every scene in the narrative) with an orgy, in which Pope Pius is portrayed as a secret libertine.

Soon after this, the male character Brisatesta narrates two scandalous encounters. The first is with "Princess Sophia, niece of the King of Prussia," who has just married "the Stadtholder" at the Hague. This is a presumed reference to Wilhelmina of Prussia, Princess of Orange, who married  the last Dutch Stadtholder, William V of Orange in 1767, and was still alive when Juliette was published thirty years later. The second encounter is with Catherine the Great, the Empress of Russia.

Publication and reception
Both Justine and Juliette were published anonymously. Napoleon ordered the arrest of the author, and as a result de Sade was incarcerated without trial for the last thirteen years of his life.

The essay (Excursus II) "Juliette or Enlightenment and Morality" in Max Horkheimer and Theodor Adorno's Dialectic of Enlightenment (1947) analyzes Juliette as the embodiment of the philosophy of enlightenment. They write: "she demonizes Catholicism as the most-up-to-date mythology -- and along with it, civilization as a whole. Her comportment is enlightened and efficient as she goes about her work of sacrilege … She favours system and consequence."

See also
 Justine Paris

Bibliography

References

External links 

 Full text of Juliette, in French

 La nouvelle Justine, ou les malheurs de la vertu, suivie de l'Histoire de Juliette, sa soeur, vol. 5, vol. 6, vol. 7, vol. 8, vol. 9, vol. 10, en Hollande, 1797.

Novels by the Marquis de Sade
Novels about ephebophilia
Works published anonymously
1797 novels
Obscenity controversies in literature
Books critical of Christianity
French philosophical novels
Novels about rape
Incest in fiction
Female characters in literature
Pope Pius VI
Censored books